Salehabad District may refer to:

 Salehabad District (Hamadan Province) in Iran
 Salehabad District (Ilam Province) in Iran

See also
 Salehabad Rural District (disambiguation)